Puliyankulam is a town in Vavuniya District, Sri Lanka. A road going through this town connects Mankulam to Vavuniya. Another road going through Puliyankulam connects Nedunkeni, Oddusuddan and Mullaitivu to Vavuniya.

Transport 
Puliyankulam railway station

See also
Thandikulam–Omanthai offensive
Operation Jayasikurui

Towns in Vavuniya District
Vavuniya North DS Division